Tiny Times may refer to:

Tiny Times (franchise)
Tiny Times, 2013 Chinese film
Tiny Times 2, 2013 Chinese film
Tiny Times 3, 2014 Chinese film
Tiny Times 4, 2015 Chinese film
Tiny Times (TV series), 2014 Chinese TV series

See also
Guo Jingming, Chinese writer who created the franchise (including novels and manga)